The New England Wolves are a Tier III junior ice hockey team playing in the Eastern Hockey League (EHL). The team plays their home games at the Merrill Fay Arena, located in Laconia, New Hampshire.

The organization also fields a developmental Tier III team (former Tier III Junior B) in the EHL Premier Division and many youth programs.

History
The Laconia Leafs played in Laconia, New Hampshire in the Tier III Junior A Atlantic Junior Hockey League (AJHL) from 2005 to 2013 when Tier III junior hockey leagues underwent a reorganization. In August 2013, they announced their re-branding to New Hampshire Lakers as part of the also re-branded AJHL in the Eastern Hockey League (EHL). However, they did not field a team for 2013–14 season. The franchise was re-located to Waterville Valley, New Hampshire and became the New England Wolves in the 2014–15 season of the EHL. In 2015, the EHL added a lower division and the current teams were all placed in the EHL-Premier Division. In 2016, the EHL-Premier Wolves returned to Laconia, joining their EHL-19U Elite Division team at Merrill Fay Arena. In 2017, the league re-branded, dropping the Premier name from their top division and renamed the Elite Division to Premier.

Prior to and during their membership in the AJHL, the Leafs had fielded a Tier III Junior B team in the Metropolitan Junior Hockey League. In 2015, EHL created an Elite Division and many of the EHL organizations moved their developmental Tier III teams from the MetJHL to the new EHL-Elite including the Wolves.

Season-by-season records

Alumni
The Leafs/Wolves have produced several players that have moved on to higher levels of junior hockey, NCAA Division I, Division III college and professional programs.

References

External links
 Home Page
 EHL Website

Ice hockey teams in New Hampshire